Guillermo Campbell Hyslop (17 July 1905, Parral, Chihuahua – 1 August 1993, El Paso, Texas)

Children and youth 

Born in Parral, Chihuahua on July 17, 1905, son of James E. Hyslop and Maria Beckmann, Guillermo came from an influential family, well known in Mexico. Guillermo spent his childhood in the city of Parral, Chihuahua , where he lived with two brothers and four sisters. At the age of 15 years Guillermo moved to El Paso, Texas, where he completed his high school studies.

Family 
Guillermo married María Aún, a lady of Syrian descent, from a conservative and influential family of Chihuahua. Guillermo and María had four children, Margarita, Elizabeth, Guillermo and Santiago.

Death 
On 1 August 1993 Guillermo Hyslop suffered a cardiac arrest.

References 

American mining businesspeople
1905 births
Mexican people of Scottish descent
1993 deaths
American people of Scottish descent